The seven-man line defenses are defensive alignments in American football that utilize seven "down linemen", or players on the line of scrimmage at the time of the snap. While now obsolete as base defenses, these were the most prominent alignments before the forward pass became prevalent and remained in use for some time thereafter. The two most common variants were the 7–2–2, or seven-box defense, and the 7–1–2–1, or seven-diamond defense:

7–2–2 defense
7–1–2–1 defense